The Moon and Sixpence is a novel by W. Somerset Maugham, first published on 15 April 1919. It is told in episodic form by a first-person narrator providing a series of glimpses into the mind and soul of the central character, Charles Strickland, a middle-aged English stockbroker, who abandons his wife and children abruptly to pursue his desire to become an artist. The story is, in part, based on the life of the painter Paul Gauguin.

Plot summary
The book is written largely from the point of view of the narrator, a young, aspiring writer and playwright in London. Certain chapters entirely comprise accounts of events by other characters, which the narrator recalls from memory, selectively editing or elaborating on certain aspects of dialogue, particularly Strickland's, because Strickland is said by the narrator to have a very poor ability to express himself in words. The narrator first develops an acquaintance with Strickland's wife at literary parties and later meets Strickland himself, who appears to be an unremarkable businessman with no interest in his wife's literary or artistic tastes.

Strickland is a well-off, middle-class stockbroker in London, sometime in the late 19th or early 20th century. Early in the novel, he leaves his wife and children and goes to Paris. The narrator enters directly into the story at that point, when he is asked by Mrs Strickland to go to Paris and talk with her husband. He lives a destitute but defiantly content life there as a painter, lodging in run-down hotels and falling prey to both illness and hunger. Strickland, in his drive to express through his art what appears to continually possess and compel him on the inside, cares nothing for physical discomfort and is indifferent to his surroundings. He is helped and supported by a commercially successful but hackneyed Dutch painter, Dirk Stroeve, coincidentally, also an old friend of the narrator, who recognises Strickland's genius as a painter. After helping Strickland recover from a life-threatening illness, Stroeve is repaid by having his wife, Blanche, abandon him for Strickland. Strickland later discards the wife, because all he really wanted from Blanche was to be a model to paint, not serious companionship. It is hinted in the novel that he indicated that to her, but she took the risk anyway. Blanche then dies by suicide. She is another human casualty in Strickland's single-minded pursuit of art and beauty, the first casualties being his own established life, and those of his wife and children.

After the Paris episode, the story continues in Tahiti. Strickland has already died, and the narrator attempts to piece together his life there from recollections of others. He finds that Strickland had taken up with a native woman, had two children by her (one of whom died), and started painting profusely. We learn that Strickland had settled for a short while in the French port of Marseilles before traveling to Tahiti, where he lived for a few years before dying of leprosy. Strickland left behind numerous paintings, but his magnum opus, which he painted on the walls of his hut before losing his sight to leprosy, was burnt by his wife after his death, as per his dying orders.

Inspiration

The Moon and Sixpence is not, of course, a life of Paul Gauguin in the form of fiction. It is founded on what I had heard about him, but I used only the main facts of his story and for the rest trusted to such gifts of invention as I was fortunate enough to possess.

The life of the French artist Paul Gauguin is the inspiration for the story, but the character of Strickland as a solitary, sociopathic and destructive genius is more related to a mythological version of Gauguin's life, which the artist himself developed and promoted, than the actual course of his life. The real Gauguin was a participant in the artistic developments in France in the 1880s, exhibiting his work regularly with the Impressionists, and being a friend and collaborator with many artists. Gauguin did work as a stockbroker, did leave his wife and family to devote his life to art, and did leave Europe for Tahiti to pursue his career. However, none of that happened in the brutal way of the novel's character. Maugham took inspiration from the published writings about Gauguin available at the time, as well as personal experience living among the artistic community in Paris in 1904, and a visit to Tahiti in 1914. Strickland is created as an extreme version of the "modern artist as 'genius'", who is indifferent and frequently hostile to the people around him.

Writing in 1953, Maugham described the idea for the book as arising during a year that he spent living in Paris in 1904: "...I met men who had known him and worked with him at Pont-Aven. I heard much about him. It occurred to me that there was in what I was told the subject of a novel". The idea remained in his mind for ten years, until a visit to Tahiti in 1914, where Maugham was able to meet people who had known Gauguin, inspired him to start writing.

The critic Amy Dickson examines the relationship between Gauguin and Strickland. She contrasts the novel's description of Strickland, "his faults are accepted as the necessary complement of his merits... but one thing can never be doubtful, and that is that he had genius", with Gauguin's description of himself: "I am an artist and you are right, you're not mad, I am a great artist and I know it. It's because I know it that I have endured such sufferings. To have done otherwise I would consider myself a brigand ― which is what many people think I am." Dickson sums up the novel as follows: "Maugham was fascinated by the impact of the arrival of modernism from Europe on an insular British consciousness and the emergence of the cult of the modernist artist-genius ― The Moon and Sixpence is at once a satire of Edwardian mores and a Gauguin biography."

About the title
According to some sources, the title, the meaning of which is not explicitly revealed in the book, was taken from a review in The Times Literary Supplement of Maugham's novel Of Human Bondage, in which the novel's protagonist, Philip Carey, is described as being "so busy yearning for the moon that he never saw the sixpence at his feet." According to a 1956 letter from Maugham, "If you look on the ground in search of a sixpence, you don't look up, and so miss the moon." Maugham's title echoes the description of Gauguin by his contemporary biographer, Meier-Graefe (1908): "He [Gauguin] may be charged with having always wanted something else."

Adaptations
The book was made into a stage play in 1925 at the New Theatre, with Henry Ainley as Strickland and Eileen Sharp as Ata. A film of the same name directed and written by Albert Lewin, was released in 1942, starring George Sanders as Charles Strickland.

The novel served as the basis for a 1957 opera, also titled The Moon and Sixpence, by John Gardner to a libretto by Patrick Terry which premiered at Sadlers Wells.

S Lee Pogostin adapted it for American TV in 1959. That production, The Moon and Sixpence (1959), starred Laurence Olivier, with Hume Cronyn and Jessica Tandy in supporting roles.

In popular culture

Ray Noble's 1932 dance band hit "We've Got the Moon and Sixpence", sung by Al Bowlly, takes its name from the book.

The book was mentioned in Agatha Christie's 1942 mystery (Hercule Poirot series) novel Five Little Pigs, when Poirot asks one of the suspects (Angela Warren) if she read the book at the time the crime was committed. The victim in the case is a married artist infatuated with a younger woman he yearns to paint, and for whom he may or may not be about to abandon his wife.

It was mentioned in James Jones's 1951 novel From Here to Eternity, in a conversation between Sergeant Warden and Corporal Mazzioli.

Jack Kerouac mentions the book in his 1958 novella The Subterraneans.

In the opening scene of François Truffaut's 1966 film Fahrenheit 451, an adaptation of Ray Bradbury's 1953 novel of the same name, several firemen are preparing books for burning. In the crowd of onlookers is a little boy who picks up one of the books and thumbs through it before his father takes it from him and throws it on the pile with the rest. That book is The Moon and Sixpence.

It is also mentioned frequently in Stephen King's 1998 novel Bag of Bones, and in passing in his 2015 novel Finders Keepers.

The Moon and Sixpence is central to the protagonist's solving the mystery in Howard Pease's 1934 novel The Ship Without a Crew.

See also

Mario Vargas Llosa's 2003 novel The Way to Paradise is also based on Paul Gauguin's life.

Notes

External links

 
 
The Moon and Sixpence at the Internet Movie Database
 

1919 British novels
Historical novels
Biographical novels
Novels by W. Somerset Maugham
Roman à clef novels
Novels about artists
Novels set in Paris
Novels set in Tahiti
Heinemann (publisher) books
British novels adapted into films
Novels adapted into operas